Aciurina michaeli is a species of tephritid or fruit flies in the genus Aciurina of the family Tephritidae.

Distribution
United States.

References

Tephritinae
Insects described in 1996
Diptera of North America